County borough is a term introduced in 1889 in the United Kingdom of Great Britain and Ireland, to refer to a borough or a city independent of county council control, similar to the unitary authorities created since the 1990s. An equivalent term used in Scotland was a county of city. They were abolished by the Local Government Act 1972 in England and Wales, but continue in use for lieutenancy and shrievalty in Northern Ireland. In the Republic of Ireland they remain in existence but have been renamed cities under the provisions of the Local Government Act 2001. The Local Government (Wales) Act 1994 re-introduced the term for certain "principal areas" in Wales. Scotland did not have county boroughs but instead had counties of cities. These were abolished on 16 May 1975. All four Scottish cities of the time—Aberdeen, Dundee, Edinburgh, and Glasgow—were included in this category. There was an additional category of large burgh in the Scottish system (similar to a municipal borough in England and Wales), which were responsible for all services apart from police, education and fire.

England and Wales

History

Initial creation 
When county councils were first created in 1889, it was decided that to let them have authority over large towns or cities would be impractical, and so any large incorporated place would have the right to be a county borough, and thus independent from the administrative county it would otherwise come under. Some cities and towns were already independent counties corporate, and most were to become county boroughs.  Originally ten county boroughs were proposed; Bristol, Hull, Newcastle upon Tyne and Nottingham, which were already counties, and Birmingham, Bradford, Leeds, Liverpool, Manchester, and Sheffield, which were not. The Local Government Act 1888 as eventually passed required a population of over 50,000 except in the case of existing counties corporate. This resulted in 61 county boroughs in England and two in Wales (Cardiff and Swansea). Several exceptions were allowed, mainly for historic towns, including Bath and Dudley, which would still remain below the 50,000 limit by the time of the 1901 census. Some of the smaller counties corporate—Berwick upon Tweed, Lichfield, Poole, Carmarthen and Haverfordwest—did not become county boroughs, although Canterbury, with a population under 25,000, did.

Growth 
The county councils and county borough councils came into operation on 1 April 1889. Just seven months later, on 9 November 1889, the city of Oxford was the first borough which had not been made a county borough by the 1888 Act to be elevated to county borough status. Various other new county boroughs were constituted in the following decades, generally as more boroughs reached the 50,000 minimum and then promoted Acts to constitute them county boroughs. The granting of county borough status was the subject of much disagreement between the large municipal boroughs and the county councils. The population limit provided county councils with a disincentive to allow mergers or boundary amendments to districts that would create authorities with large populations, as this would allow them to seek county borough status and remove the tax base from the administrative county.

County boroughs to be constituted in this era were a mixed bag, including some towns that would continue to expand such as Bournemouth and Southend-on-Sea. Other towns such as Burton upon Trent and Dewsbury were not to increase in population much past 50,000. 1913 saw the attempts of Luton and Cambridge to gain county borough status defeated in the House of Commons, despite the approval of the Local Government Board – the removal of Cambridge from Cambridgeshire would have reduced the income of Cambridgeshire County Council by over half.

Slowdown 

Upon recommendation of a commission chaired by the Earl of Onslow, the population threshold was raised to 75,000 in 1926, by the Local Government (County Boroughs and Adjustments) Act 1926, which also made it much harder to expand boundaries. The threshold was raised to 100,000 by the Local Government Act 1958.

The viability of the county borough of Merthyr Tydfil came into question in the 1930s. Due to a decline in the heavy industries of the town, by 1932 more than half the male population was unemployed, resulting in very high municipal rates in order to make public assistance payments. At the same time the population of the borough was lower than when it had been created in 1908. A royal commission was appointed in May 1935 to "investigate whether the existing status of Merthyr Tydfil as a county borough should be continued, and if not, what other arrangements should be made". The commission reported the following November, and recommended that Merthyr should revert to the status of a non-county borough, and that public assistance should be taken over by central government. In the event county borough status was retained by the town, with the chairman of the Welsh Board of Health appointed as administrative adviser in 1936.

After the Second World War the creation of new county boroughs in England and Wales was effectively suspended, pending a local government review. A government white paper published in 1945 stated that "it is expected that there will be a number of Bills for extending or creating county boroughs" and proposed the creation of a boundary commission to bring coordination to local government reform. The policy in the paper also ruled out the creation of new county boroughs in Middlesex "owing to its special problems". The Local Government Boundary Commission was appointed on 26 October 1945, under the chairmanship of Sir Malcolm Trustram Eve, delivering its report in 1947. The commission recommended that towns with a population of 200,000 or more should become one-tier "new counties", with "new county boroughs" having a population of 60,000 – 200,000 being "most-purpose authorities", with the county council of the administrative county providing certain limited services. The report envisaged the creation of 47 two-tiered "new counties", 21 one-tiered "new counties" and 63 "new county boroughs". The recommendations of the commission extended to a review of the division of functions between different tiers of local government, and thus fell outside its terms of reference, and its report was not acted upon.

Partial reform 
The next attempt at reform was by the Local Government Act 1958, which established the Local Government Commission for England and the Local Government Commission for Wales to carry out reviews of existing local government structures and recommend reforms. Although the Commissions did not complete their work before being dissolved, a handful of new county boroughs were constituted between 1964 and 1968.  Luton, Torbay, and Solihull gained county borough status. Additionally, the County Borough of Teesside was formed from a merger of the existing county borough of Middlesbrough, and the municipal boroughs of Stockton-on-Tees, Redcar and Thornaby; Warley was formed from the county borough of Smethwick and the non-county boroughs of Oldbury and Rowley Regis; and West Hartlepool was merged with Hartlepool. Following these changes, there was a total of 79 county boroughs in England. The Commission also recommended the downgrading of Barnsley to be a non-county borough, but this was not carried out.

Abolition 

The county boroughs of East Ham, West Ham and Croydon were abolished in 1965 with the creation of Greater London and went on to form parts of London boroughs. The remaining county boroughs were abolished in 1974 under the Local Government Act 1972, and replaced with non-metropolitan districts and metropolitan districts, all beneath county councils in a two-tier structure. In Greater London and the metropolitan counties the lower tier districts retained a wider range of powers than in the non-metropolitan counties.

Revival 

This situation did not persist long.  In 1986 the metropolitan county councils and the Greater London Council were abolished, returning the metropolitan boroughs to a status equivalent to the former county boroughs, but sharing some powers (police and transport for example).  In the 1990s, many of the nonmetropolitan former county boroughs were reformed again as unitary authorities – essentially the same as a county borough. As a result, by 2015, most former county boroughs were either metropolitan boroughs or unitary authorities with a status similar to the old county boroughs. In England, most of those former county boroughs that did not gain unitary authority status—Barrow-in-Furness, Burnley, Canterbury, Carlisle, Chester, Eastbourne, Gloucester, Great Yarmouth, Hastings, Ipswich, Lincoln, Northampton, Norwich, Oxford, Preston, and Worcester—have given their names to non-unitary local government districts (in some cases coterminous with the old county borough, in other cases much larger). Burton upon Trent became an unparished area in the East Staffordshire borough, and has now been divided into several parishes.

In Wales, several principal areas are county boroughs:

 Newport (acquired city status in 2002)
 Merthyr Tydfil
 Caerphilly
 Blaenau Gwent
 Torfaen
 Vale of Glamorgan
 Bridgend
 Rhondda Cynon Taf
 Neath Port Talbot
 Wrexham
 Conwy

For all practical purposes, county boroughs are exactly the same as the other principal areas of Wales called "counties" (including "cities and counties") as all these areas are run by unitary authorities (i.e.: have the functions of both boroughs and counties). Although unitary authorities are functionally equivalent to county boroughs, only in Wales is the title given official recognition by Act of Parliament.

English county boroughs in 1973 

The map depicts the county boroughs in England immediately prior to their abolition in 1974.  County boroughs in Wales and Northern Ireland are not shown.

This table shows those county boroughs that existed in England and Wales between the Local Government Acts of 1888 (that created them) and 1972 (that abolished them from 1974).

Only four districts with more than one county borough were formed: Wirral, Sandwell, Sefton and Kirklees. Elsewhere, county boroughs usually formed the core or all of a district named after the county borough – with the exceptions of Halifax, whose metropolitan district was named Calderdale, Burton upon Trent, which became part of the East Staffordshire district, and Teesside, which was split up between three non-metropolitan districts.

Previous county boroughs 

County boroughs to be abolished prior to 1974 were:

Northern Ireland 
The county boroughs of Belfast and Derry were created by the Local Government (Ireland) Act 1898.

In Northern Ireland, local government has not used county boroughs since 1973, but they remain in use for lieutenancy.

For administrative purposes the two county boroughs in Northern Ireland were replaced with two larger districts (Belfast and Londonderry).

Republic of Ireland
The Local Government (Ireland) Act 1898 created county boroughs in Ireland. Under the Act, four former counties corporate (Cork, Dublin, Limerick and Waterford) became county boroughs.

Galway became a county borough in 1986.

In the Republic of Ireland, the relevant legislation remained in force (although amended), and county boroughs on the original model existed until 2001. Under the Local Government Act 2001 (which replaced most existing local government legislation in Ireland), the term "County Borough" was abolished and replaced with "City" (and hence, "Corporation" with "City Council"). However Kilkenny, while a traditional city, was never a county borough. Under the Local Government Reform Act 2014, the borough of Kilkenny was abolished, but the municipal district containing the administrative area of the former borough of Kilkenny would be known as the Municipal District of Kilkenny City.

See also 
 County corporate
 List of administrative counties and county boroughs of England by population in 1971
 London boroughs
 Metropolitan borough
 Municipal borough

References 

Types of administrative division
Local government in the Republic of Ireland
Types of subdivision in the United Kingdom
Boroughs of the United Kingdom